Robert Young Stuart (1883–1933) was the fourth Chief of the United States Forest Service (USFS) of the Department of Agriculture, and was appointed on May 1, 1928, succeeding William B. Greeley. He served as Chief until his death on October 23, 1933.

Early life and education
Robert Young Stuart was born February 13, 1883, on a farm in Cumberland County, Pennsylvania. He earned B.A. and M.A. degrees at Dickinson College in Carlisle, and a M.F. degree from Yale University in 1906.

Career
In 1906 Stuart began working for the U.S. Forest Service in the Northern Rocky Mountain District where he became Assistant District Forester in charge of operation and then silviculture, which included timber sales and planting. In November 1912 he moved to Washington, DC to serve as assistant chief of silviculture.

During World War I he spent two years overseas, from September 1917 to June 1919, under William B. Greeley with the Tenth and Twentieth (Forestry) Engineer Regiments in France. He was promoted to Major on October 1, 1918, with assignment to general headquarters at Chaumont. On February 19, 1919, he became commanding officer of the 5th Battalion of the 20th (Forest) Engineers and district  commander  of the forest troops in the Gien District. For his services with the  American Expeditionary Force he received a citation from General John J. Pershing.

In 1920 he accepted the post of Deputy Commissioner of Forestry in Pennsylvania, serving under Gifford Pinchot and then becoming Commissioner of Forestry in 1922 when Pinchot became Governor.

Early in 1927 Stuart rejoined the Forest Service as Assistant Forester in charge of public relations, and was promoted to Chief a year later when William B. Greeley resigned. Stuart officially became the 4th Chief of the Forest Service on May 1, 1928.

During the early years of the Great Depression, Stuart led the Forest Service in creating job opportunities for the unemployed on the national forests, including guiding the forestry work of the Civilian Conservation Corps. He also oversaw the McSweeney-McNary Act of 1928 promoting forest research, and the Knutson-Vandenburg Act of 1930 expanding tree planting on the national forests.

Personal life
Stuart married Janet M.A. Wilson of Harrisburg, Pennsylvania, in 1907. They had two children, Janet Crichton and Helen Stuart.

Stuart was killed by an accidental fall from a seventh floor window of the Atlantic Building, the Washington DC headquarters of the Forest Service, on the morning of October 23, 1933.

In March 1934 the forest tree nursery on the Kisatchie National Forest in Louisiana was named by the Forest Service in his honor.

See also
United States Chief Foresters

References

External links
 Robert Y. Stuart biographical profile (Forest History Society)

American foresters
United States Forest Service officials
History of forestry in the United States
Yale University alumni
1883 births
1934 deaths